Alfred Hector Wright  (March 30, 1842 – April 20, 1905) was a Manager in Major League Baseball. He managed the Philadelphia Athletics of the National League during the 1876 season.

His career managerial record was 14–45 in 60 games for a finish of seventh place.

External links
Baseball Reference Managerial record

1842 births
1905 deaths
Philadelphia Athletics (NA) managers
Burials at Green-Wood Cemetery